Michael Fachtna O'Donovan (1921 - 17 October 1995) was an Irish sportsperson. He played Gaelic football with his local club Clonakilty and was a member of the Cork senior inter-county team from 1943 until 1949.

Career

O'Donovan first came to Gaelic football prominence with the Carbery Rangers team that won consecutive Southwest Junior Championship titles. Around this time he was also drafted onto the Cork minor team and won a Munster Minor Championship title in 1939. O'Donovan subsequently transferred to the Clonakilty club that was enjoying a golden age in terms of success and won six County Championship titles in ten years. He was soon added to the Cork senior team and claimed his first silverware in 1943 when Cork won the Munster Senior Championship for the first time in 15 years. O'Donovan won a second provincial title two years later before ending the season by lining out at midfield when Cork claimed the All-Ireland title after a defeat of Cavan in the final. He claimed a third Munster Championship title in his last year with the team in 1949. O'Donovan also won a Railway Cup medal with Munster in 1948.

Death

O'Donovan died at St Anne's Hospital in Skibbereen on 17 October 1995.

Honours

Carbery Rangers
West Cork Junior A Football Championship (2): 1939, 1940

Clonakilty
Cork Senior Football Championship (6): 1942, 1943, 1944, 1946, 1947, 1952
West Cork Junior A Hurling Championship (5): 1939, 1943, 1944, 1945, 1946

Cork
All-Ireland Senior Football Championship (1): 1945
Munster Senior Football Championship (3): 1943, 1945, 1949
Munster Minor Football Championship (1): 1939

Munster
Railway Cup (1): 1948

References

1921 births
1995 deaths
Carbery Rangers Gaelic footballers
Clonakilty Gaelic footballers
Clonakilty hurlers
Cork inter-county Gaelic footballers
Munster inter-provincial Gaelic footballers